The 2008 Maine Black Bears football team was an American football team that represented the University of Maine as a member of the Colonial Athletic Association (CAA) during the 2008 NCAA Division I FCS football season. In their 16th season under head coach Jack Cosgrove, the Black Bears compiled an 8–5 record (5–3 against conference opponents), finished second in the CAA's North Division, and lost to Northern Iowa in the first round of the NCAA FCS playoffs. Jovan Belcher and Jhamal Fluellen were the team captains.

Schedule

References

Maine
Maine Black Bears football seasons
Maine Black Bears football